Sir Mark Phillip Hendrick (born 2 November 1958) is a British Labour and Co-operative politician. He has been the Member of Parliament (MP) for Preston since a by-election in 2000. Hendrick was previously elected to the Central Lancashire seat as a Member of the European Parliament (MEP) from 1994 to 1999.

Early life
Hendrick was born in 1958 in Salford, Lancashire. He is of Anglo-Somali descent. His father worked in the timber industry. He studied at the Salford Grammar School. He later attended Liverpool Polytechnic (now Liverpool John Moores University), where he completed a Bachelor of Science degree in Electrical and Electronic Engineering. He also earned a Master of Science degree in Computer Science from the University of Manchester. Additionally, Hendrick is a Chartered Engineer and holds a Certificate in Education (a teaching qualification) from the same institution.

Training and early career
Hendrick trained as a student engineer with the Ministry of Defence in 1979 at the Royal Signals and Radar Establishment, Malvern, Worcestershire. He later studied German at a Volkshochschule Hanau in Germany in 1981, where he trained as a student engineer with AEG Telefunken. In 1982, he was appointed as a Higher Professional and Technology engineer with the Science and Engineering Research Council (SERC), Daresbury Laboratory, and stayed with the SERC for six years.

In 1990, Hendrick joined Stockport College of Further and Higher Education, where he worked for four years as a lecturer in Digital Electronics and Software Design.

Political career

Local government and European Parliament
	
	
From 1984 to 1994, Hendrick was the Secretary of the Salford Co-operative Party. He was elected a councillor to the City of Salford Council in 1987 and served in this capacity for eight years. He was also the Chairman of the Eccles Constituency Labour Party from 1990 to 1994. During the 1994 European Parliament Election, Hendrick was elected for the Central Lancashire seat. He served for five years until losing an election bid at the 1999 European Parliament Election, which was run on a regional PR list system.

House of Commons
Hendrick was elected to the House of Commons at the 2000 Preston by-election after the sitting Labour MP Audrey Wise had died. He retained the seat with a majority of 4,426, and made his maiden speech on 11 December 2000. Hendrick has retained his seat at each subsequent general election.

In Parliament, Hendrick was a member of the European Scrutiny Select Committee for three years from 2001. He served as the Parliamentary Private Secretary to the Secretary of State for the Environment, Food and Rural Affairs (2003–2006); Foreign Secretary Margaret Beckett (2006–2007); Lord High Chancellor of Great Britain and Secretary of State for Justice Jack Straw (2007–2008); Ivan Lewis, Minister of State for Foreign and Commonwealth Affairs (2009–2010). Hendrick also served on the International Development Committee from 2009 to 2010.

In 2002, Hendrick successfully campaigned for and achieved free access for the public to the National Football Museum then based in Preston. He campaigned for City Status for Preston, which was successful and awarded to Preston in the Queen's Golden Jubilee Awards in 2002.

From November 2010 to the summer of 2012, Hendrick was appointed to the front bench by Labour Leader Ed Miliband as an Opposition Assistant Whip. Returning to the backbenches, he was later appointed to the Foreign Affairs Select Committee from June 2012 to June 2017.

In July 2015, Hendrick was appointed to the High Speed Rail (HS2) Committee in July 2015 and re-appointed to the Foreign Affairs Select Committee which he served on until May 2017.  Hendrick was appointed to the International Trade Select Committee in July 2018.

Hendrick is a member of various All Party Parliamentary Groups and is currently Chair of the Norway APPG. Hendrick was Chairman of the All Party Parliamentary Group (APPG) China from 2010 to 2012 and is currently a vice-chair. He is the Treasurer for the All-Party Parliamentary British-German Group.  He was also a member of the UK delegation to the Organization for Security and Co-Operation in Europe Parliamentary Assembly (OSCEPA) from 2008 to 2020.

Hendrick's political interests include foreign affairs, international development, defence, European, economic, monetary and industrial affairs.

Hendrick was appointed a Knight Bachelor in the 2018 New Year Honours for parliamentary and political service.

In 2022 Hendrick introduced the Co-operatives, Mutuals and Friendly Societies Bill to Parliament, an element of which, protecting mutual ownership of co-operative assets, was taken up as Government legislation

Publications
Changing States 1995
The Euro and Co-operative Enterprise 1998
"Question Time Conundrum", Tribune 13 February 2014
The Ukrainian Crisis: Russia’s relationship with former Soviet States Post EU/NATO Enlargement

"A View to Brazil", The House Magazine 7 May 2014
"The Impact of Foreign Players on the Premier League and on England's National Team" Huffington Post 12 June 2014
"The Government Reforms and Future Election of Aung San Suu Kyi to the Presidency Are Only the Beginning on Burma's Long Road to Being an Inclusive, Democratic Society", Huffington Post 1 July 2014

References

External links
Official site

1958 births
Living people
Alumni of Liverpool John Moores University
Alumni of the Victoria University of Manchester
English people of Somali descent
English computer scientists
English electrical engineers
Councillors in Greater Manchester
Knights Bachelor
Labour Co-operative MPs for English constituencies
Labour Party (UK) MEPs
MEPs for England 1994–1999
People educated at Salford Grammar School
People from Salford
UK MPs 1997–2001
UK MPs 2001–2005
UK MPs 2005–2010
UK MPs 2010–2015
UK MPs 2015–2017
UK MPs 2017–2019
UK MPs 2019–present
Black British MPs
Politicians awarded knighthoods